Star GS Hellas (previously called Star Hellas) is a national beauty pageant responsible for selecting Greece's representative to the Miss Universe and Mister Supranational pageant. The first Miss Universe Greece pageant was titled in 2021.

History 
The first Star Hellas at Miss Universe competition took place in 1952. In the 1970s and early 1980s, the pageant was broadcast every year by the Ellinikí Radiofonía Tileórasi. From 1990 to 2010, it was funded and broadcast on Greece's private network ANT1.

Miss Universe Greece expects to hold a pageant with the motto "confidently beautiful". The winner will be the entrant to Miss Universe each year. Greece did not compete in 1988, 2016 and 2017.

International crowns 
 One – Miss Universe winner: Corinna Tsopei (1964)

Titleholders

 Winner International Title 
 Miss Universe Greece
 Miss Earth Greece
 Miss Supranational Greece 
 Miss Intercontinental Greece
 Mister Supranational Greece

Representatives to international beauty pageants

Miss Universe Greece

Started in 2021. Star GS Hellas took over the license of Miss Universe. The winner represents Greece at the Miss Universe pageant. On occasion, when the winner does not qualify (due to age) for either contest, a runner-up is sent.

Star Hellas 1952-2018

Miss Earth Greece

Miss Supranational Greece

Mister Supranational Greece

Mister GS Hellas owned the license of Mister Supranational in 2021. Then main winner of Mister GS Hellas represents Greece at Mister Supranational male pageant.

References

External links

Beauty pageants in Greece
Greek awards
Greece